Open Gates is a neighborhood in southwestern Lexington, Kentucky, United States. Its boundaries are New Circle Road to the south, Clays Mill Road to the west, Norfolk Southern railroad tracks to the east, and Pasadena Drive to the north.

Neighborhood statistics
 Area: 
 Population: 1,657
 Population density: 2,662 people per square mile
 Median household income: $55,746

External links
 http://www.city-data.com/neighborhood/Open-Gates-Lexington-KY.html

Neighborhoods in Lexington, Kentucky